Yanmen is a mountain pass which includes three fortified gatehouses along the Great Wall of China.

Yanmen may also refer to:
Yanmen Commandery, a former imperial Chinese commandery in Shanxi
Yanmenguan Township, a township surrounding the pass
Yanmenguan Village, a village beside the pass
Yanmen Circuit, a former imperial Chinese circuit governed by Li Keyong
Yanmen, Mayang, a town in Mayang Miao Autonomous County, Hunan, China
Yanmen, a town in Jiangyou, Sichuan, China

See also
 Yanmen Pass, a 1940 Chinese film